The 2018 Caroline Wozniacki tennis season officially began on 1 January 2018 with the start of the 2018 WTA Tour. Caroline Wozniacki entered the season ranked as world number 3 behind Simona Halep and Garbiñe Muguruza following the completion of the 2017 season.

Year in detail

Early hard court season

Auckland Open
Wozniacki began her season at the Auckland Open. She was the top seed and advanced to the final after successfully defeating Madison Brengle, Petra Martić, Sofia Kenin and Sachia Vickery. However, she would be defeated in straight sets by the same opponent who eliminated her in the previous year's quarterfinals, Julia Görges, in straight sets.

Australian Open

Her next tournament was the Australian Open. She was seeded second, her highest seeding since the 2012 Australian Open. She defeated Mihaela Buzărnescu in straight sets before going on to beat Jana Fett in three sets after saving two match points. She then beat Kiki Bertens and Magdaléna Rybáriková both in straight sets to reach the quarterfinals. In the quarterfinals, she beat Carla Suárez Navarro in three sets to advance to her second Australian Open semifinal since 2011. In the semifinals she beat Elise Mertens to advance to her third Grand Slam final and her first since 2014.

Her last opponent was Simona Halep. Wozniacki took the opening set in a tiebreak, while Halep winning the second set. The third set had the most breaks of serve. After a series of breaks, Wozniacki won two points in a row to reach championship point. Wozniacki won the point, the match and the championship, after Halep hit a backhand into the net to become the seventh woman to win the title after being match point down in Open Era.

After winning her first grand slam title, she regained the world No. 1 ranking on 29 January 2018.  Wozniacki was last ranked No. 1 on 29 January 2012, exactly 6 years ago, and her new ascension beats Serena Williams' previous record of 5 years 29 days.

St. Petersburg Ladies' Trophy
Wozniacki's next tournament was the St. Petersburg Ladies' Trophy, which she entered in the second round. She defeated the young Russian, Anastasia Potapova, in straight sets before she lost to Daria Kasatkina in the quarterfinals.

Qatar Open

Wozniacki then played in the Qatar Open, where she received a bye in the first round. She defeated Carina Witthöft with a bagel in the second set. The Australian Open champion put together a dominant performance and needed just 57 minutes to record the victory. She then defeated Monica Niculescu in straight sets to extend her head-to-head advantage to 9–0 over the Romanian. Her next opponent was former world No. 1, Angelique Kerber. Kerber got out to a fast start but the first set went to a tiebreak and ended in Wozniacki's favour. Kerber easily won set two. The third set was a marathon of long rallies but Wozniacki won in a gruelling two hours and 20 minutes. Against Petra Kvitová, Wozniacki wasn't so lucky. She lost, despite having two chances to serve for the match. However, with her Qatar performance, she became only the fourth player in WTA history to surpass $30,000,000 in career prize earnings.

March sunshine events

Indian Wells Open
Wozniacki then played the Indian Wells Open, where she received a bye in the first round. She defeated Lara Arruabarrena and Aliaksandra Sasnovich, in straight sets and three sets respectively before she lost to Daria Kasatkina again in the fourth round.

Miami Open
Wozniacki then entered the Miami Open, where she also received a bye in the first round. However, she lost to the Summer Olympics champion Monica Puig in three sets after sending a bagel in the opening set.

European clay court season

Istanbul Cup
Wozniacki started her 2018 clay season in the İstanbul Cup, where she defeated Ekaterina Alexandrova and Sara Errani in straight sets and three sets respectively. However, she chose to retire from the event against the eventual winner Pauline Parmentier in the quarterfinals.

Madrid Open
Wozniacki then played the Madrid Open. She defeated two Australians, Daria Gavrilova and Ashleigh Barty, and advanced into the third round. However, she lost to the eventual runner-up Kiki Bertens, who was defeated in the Australian Open, in straight sets.

Italian Open
Wozniacki's next tournament was the Italian Open, where she received a bye in the first round. She defeated Alison Van Uytvanck in straight sets in the second round and Anastasija Sevastova in three sets in the third round respectively before she lost to Anett Kontaveit in straight sets in the quarterfinals.

French Open
In the French Open, Wozniacki was the 2nd seed. In the first round, she defeated Danielle Collins after the opening-set tiebreak. In the second round, she easily defeated the Spanish qualifier Georgina García Pérez in just fifty minutes. Her opponent in the third round was the local people Pauline Parmentier, who just defeated Caroline couple of weeks ago on the way to her first WTA title since 2008. Wozniacki defeated the Frenchwoman in straight sets after sending a bagel in the opening set. Her next opponent was the 14th seed Daria Kasatkina, who defeated Wozniacki twice this year. Wozniacki eventually lost to the Russian in straight sets again after the match delayed to Monday.

United Kingdom grass court Season

Eastbourne International
Wozniacki started her 2018 grass season in the Eastbourne International, where she was the runner-up last year. She started her competition in the second round, where she defeated Camila Giorgi. In the third round, she defeated Johanna Konta for the first time in her career, in three sets. After defeating Ashleigh Barty in straight sets, she reached the semi-finals for the fifth time in six years. She successfully defeated Angelique Kerber in three sets after saving a match point to advance into final. Her final opponent of the tournament was Aryna Sabalenka and the match was their first meet. Eventually, the Dane defeated the Byelorussian to win her second title of the year, and her 29th overall. The final also marked her 600th career match win.

Wimbledon Championships
Wozniacki then played in the Wimbledon Championships, where she was seeded second. In the first round, she successfully defeated Varvara Lepchenko after sending a bagel. However, she lost to Ekaterina Makarova, who defeated Wozniacki in the US Open also in the second round last year, in three sets despite saving five match points.

Summer US Open series

Washington Open
Wozniacki was scheduled to participate in the Washington Open, where she was supposed to be the top seed, but she was forced to retired before her first-round match against Anhelina Kalinina due to a right leg injury.

Canadian Open
After the retirement in Washington, she then participated in the Canadian Open, where she received a bye in the first round. Her first opponent was Aryna Sabalenka, who was defeated in the final of Eastbourne in straight sets. However, this time she lost to the Belarusian in three sets after wasting three match points.

Cincinnati Open
At Cincinnati, Wozniacki retired against the eventual winner Kiki Bertens in her first match of the tournament after losing the opening set because of a left knee injury.

US Open

In the US Open, Wozniacki defeated former champion Samantha Stosur in straight sets before she lost to Lesia Tsurenko in the second round.

East Asian hardcourt season

Toray Pan Pacific Open
In fall, Wozniacki played the Pan Pacific Open, where she was the top seed, by receiving a wildcard as the defending champion. However, she lost to Camila Giorgi in three sets in the second round.

Wuhan Open
A week later, in Wuhan, Wozniacki was upset by Monica Puig for the second time this season in straight sets in third round after defeated qualifier Rebecca Peterson.

China Open
Wozniacki then played the China Open. In the first round, she defeated Belinda Bencic, who had a small advantage on head-to-head, in straight sets. Then she defeated Petra Martić for the second time this year in straight sets. In the third round, She successfully defeated Anett Kontaveit, who defeated the Dann at Montreal in straight sets. In the semifinals, she upset local favourite Wang Qiang in straight sets. In the final, she successfully held off Anastasija Sevastova to win the China Open title for the second time in her career without losing a set. This was also her first Premier Mandatory level title since winning the 2011 BNP Paribas Open and her 30th WTA title.

Year-end Championships

WTA Finals
After reaching the quarterfinals in Beijing in her last tournament, Wozniacki became the fifth player to secure Singapore spot. As the second seed, she led the White Group, alongside Petra Kvitová, Elina Svitolina and Karolína Plíšková. However, her road to defend her title didn't start very well. In her first round robin match, she lost to World No. 7 Karolína Plíšková in straight sets after saving two match points. She then defeated Petra Kvitová in three sets before was upset by Elina Svitolina. The outcome made her finished third in the group, which meant she was unable to advance into the semifinals.

After eliminating in the round robin, Wozniacki announced that she was diagnosed with Rheumatoid arthritis, but would like to become a role model for people with the condition. Nevertheless, she still finished the season as World No. 3.

All matches

Singles matches

Tournament schedule

Singles schedule
Wozniacki's 2018 singles tournament schedule is as follows:

Yearly records

Head-to-head matchups

Players are ordered by letter.

Top 10 wins

Finals
Singles: 4 (3 titles, 1 runner-up)

Earnings
The tournaments won by Wozniacki are in boldface.

See also

 2018 WTA Tour
 2018 Angelique Kerber tennis season
 2018 Simona Halep tennis season
 Caroline Wozniacki career statistics
 List of career achievements by Caroline Wozniacki
 List of WTA number 1 ranked tennis players
 WTA Tour records

Notes

References

External links

 Official website
 Caroline Wozniacki at the Women's Tennis Association
 Caroline Wozniacki at the International Tennis Federation
 Caroline Wozniacki at the Fed Cup
 Caroline Wozniacki on IMDb
 Caroline Wozniacki at the International Olympic Committee
 Caroline Wozniacki at Olympics at Sports-Reference.com

Caroline Wozniacki tennis seasons
Wozniacki
Wozniacki